Frederick or Fred Hawkins may refer to:

 Frederick Hawkins (politician) (died 1956), Irish politician
 Frederick Hawkins (cricketer) (1888–1975), English cricketer 
 Erick Hawkins (Frederick Hawkins, 1909–1994), born American choreographer
 Fred Hawkins (1923–2014), American golfer
 Fred Hawkins (politician) (born 1967), American politician in Florida